Jujubinus exasperatus, the Rough Top Shell, is a species of sea snail, a marine gastropod mollusk in the family Trochidae, the top snails.

Description

The shape of this shell is conical, with straight sides and a flat imperforate base with ca. 6 spiral cords which are smoother than on the whorls. The sides show four-five beaded cords. These are narrower than the interspaces in which there are very fine, prosocline lamellae. A considerably thicker compound cord is seen above the suture on the spire and at the periphery of body whorl. The aperture is subquadrangular, with a moderate denticle at the base of the columella. The outer lip has a cutting edge. The background color of the first whorls is typically reddish, the later whorls usually whitish with red, brown or (more rarely) black flames. The peripheral cord is usually articulated with red and white. The apex is pink. Interior of aperture is nacreous. This sea snail is herbivorous, feeding on algae.

Distribution
This species occurs in Eastern Atlantic, from the British islands to Portugal and Morocco and in the Mediterranean Sea, mainly in Spain, Italy, Greece. It is common in the seagrass prairies of Posidonia oceanica, at depths of 0 to 30 m.

References

 Gmelin J. F., 1791: Carli Linnaei systema Naturae per regna tria naturae. Editio decimatertia, aucta, reformata, Vermes Testacea; Leipzig [Lipsiae] 1 (6): 3021–3910 [molluschi].
 Pulteney R., 1799: Catalogue of the birds, shells, and some of the more rare plants of Dorsetshire; London, Nichols pp. 92
 Brocchi G. B., 1814: Conchiologia fossile subappenninica con osservazioni geologiche sugli Appennini e sul suolo adiacente; Milano Vol. I: pp. LXXX + 56 + 240. Vol. II: pp. 241–712. Con 16 tavole 
 Lamarck ([J.-B. M.] de), 1815–1822: Histoire naturelle des animaux sans vertèbres; Paris [vol. 5: Paris, Deterville/Verdière] [vol. 6 published by the Author] 7 vol. [I molluschi sono compresi nei vol. 5–7. Vol. 5 (Les Conchiferes): 612 pp. [25 luglio 1818]. Vol. 6 (1) (Suite): 343 pp. [1819]. Vol. 6 (2) (Suite): 232 pp. [1822]. Vol. 7: (Suite): 711 pp. 1822 
 Payraudeau B. C., 1826: Catalogue descriptif et méthodique des Annelides et des Mollusques de l'île de Corse; Paris pp. 218 + 8 pl.
 Risso A., 1826–1827: Histoire naturelle des principales productions de l'Europe Méridionale et particulièrement de celles des environs de Nice et des Alpes Maritimes; Paris, Levrault Vol. 1: XII + 448 + 1 carta [1826]. Vol. 2: VII + 482 + 8 pl. (fiori) [novembre 1827]. Vol. 3: XVI + 480 + 14 pl. (pesci) [settembre 1827]. Vol. 4: IV + 439 + 12 pl. (molluschi) [novembre 1826]. Vol. 5: VIII + 400 + 10 pl. (altri invertebrati)
 Blainville H. M. (D. de), 1828–1830: Malacozoaires ou Animaux Mollusques. [in] Faune Française; Levrault, Paris 320 p., 48 pl. [livr. 18 (1828) p. 1–80; livr. 2 (1829) p. 81–176; livr. 23 (1829) p. 177–240; livr. 28 (1830) p. 241–320]
 Aradas A. & Maggiore G., 1841?: Sunto di quattro memorie malacologiche... Monografia del genere Eulima dal Sig. Risso per la fauna Siciliana. Monografia del genere Orthostelis. Monografia del genere Maravignia. Descrizione di due nuove specie siciliane del genere Trochus; Giornale del Gabinetto Gioenio 6(3): 1–10 [Philippi (1844: 225) 
 Monterosato T. A. (di), 1880: Notizie intorno ad alcune conchiglie delle coste d'Africa ; Bullettino della Società Malacologica Italiana, Pisa 5: 213–233
 Monterosato T. A. (di), 1884: Nomenclatura generica e specifica di alcune conchiglie mediterranee ; Palermo, Virzi pp. 152
 Bucquoy E., Dautzenberg P. & Dollfus G., 1882–1886: Les mollusques marins du Roussillon. Tome Ier. Gastropodes.; Paris, J.B. Baillière & fils 570 p., 66 pl. 
 Sturany R., 1896: Zoologische Ergebnisse VII. Mollusken I (Prosobranchier und Opisthobranchier; Scaphopoden; Lamellibranchier) gesammelt von S.M. Schiff "Pola" 1890–1894.; Denkschriften der Kaiserlichen Akademie der Wissenschaften, Mathematische-Naturwissenschaftlischen Classe 63: 1–36, pl.1-2
 Pallary P., 1900: Coquilles marines du littoral du Départment d'Oran; Journal de Conchyliologie 48 (3): 211–422, pl. 6–8
 Coen G., 1933: Saggio di una Sylloge Molluscorum Adriaticorum; Memorie del Regio Comitato Talassografico Italiano 192: pp. i–vii, 1–186
 Ghisotti F. & Melone G., 1969–1975: Catalogo illustrato delle conchiglie marine del Mediterraneo Conchiglie Part 1: suppl. 5 (11–12): 1–28 [1969]. Part 2: suppl. 6 (3–4): 29–46 [1970]. Part 3: suppl. 7 (1–2): 47–77 [1971]. Part 4. suppl. 8 (11–12): 79–144 [1972]. Part 5. suppl. 11 (11–12): 147–208 [1975]
 Arnaud, P., 1978: Révision des taxa malacologiques méditerranens introduits par Antoine Risso; Annales du Muséum d'Histoire Naturelle de Nice 5: 101–150

External links
PESI

exasperatus
Molluscs described in 1777
Molluscs of the Atlantic Ocean
Molluscs of the Mediterranean Sea